Niland is a surname. Notable people with the surname include:

 Conor Niland (born 1981), tennis player
 D'Arcy Niland (1917–1967), author
 Deborah Niland (born 1950), illustrator
 Elly Niland (born 1954), poet
 John Niland (born 1940), academic
 John Niland (American football) (born 1944), footballer
 Kilmeny Niland (1950–2009), illustrator
 Mary Kevin Niland, clerk
 Niland brothers
 Nora Niland (1913–1988), librarian
 Tom Niland (1870–1950), baseballer

See also
 Model Arts and Niland Gallery
 Niland, California